Yongning Subdistrict is a subdistrict in Naxi District, Luzhou, Sichuan, China. , it has 7 residential communities and 3 villages under its administration.

See also 
 List of township-level divisions of Sichuan

References 

Township-level divisions of Sichuan
Luzhou